Smith Inlet is a bay,  wide, partially filled with the ice tongue of Barnett Glacier. It is located between Cape Moore and Cape Oakeley along the coast of northern Victoria Land, and was discovered by Captain James C. Ross, 1841, who named it for Alexander J. Smith, mate on the Erebus.

References
 

Bays of Antarctica
Landforms of Victoria Land
Pennell Coast